KK Atletas is a professional basketball club that is based in Kaunas district, Lithuania. Currently the team plays in the National Basketball League, in the past Atletas participated in the LKL and the Baltic League, before dissolving in 2007 and becoming BC Aisčiai-Atletas. In 2009, the team merged with BC Kaunas Triobet and played with the names of Kaunas, Baltai and LSU-Baltai. In 2013 club was renamed again to LSU-Atletas, which was merged with the NKL champions of the same name. Atletas are multiple time LKL finalists, and were once considered to be one of the strongest teams in Lithuania. 

The NBA center Žydrūnas Ilgauskas represented Atletas at the very beginning of his career. Lithuanian basketball star Saulius Štombergas was also a key player of the team back then. Donatas Motiejūnas also played for Atletas (at the time called Aisčiai) during the beginning of his career.

Latest seasons

Honours

Domestic competitions
Lithuanian SSR Championship
 Winners (5): 1968, 1982, 1983, 1989, 1990

Notable former players 
  Rimas Kurtinaitis
  Tomas Pačėsas
  Gvidonas Markevičius
  Darius Dimavičius
  Rytis Vaišvila
  Darius Sirtautas
  Saulius Štombergas
  Tomas Masiulis
  Virginijus Praškevičius
  Žydrūnas Ilgauskas
  Donatas Motiejūnas
  Artūras Milaknis
  Povilas Butkevičius
  Šarūnas Vasiliauskas
  Siim-Sander Vene
  Jonas Mačiulis

External links 

Aisciai
Sport in Kaunas
1962 establishments in Lithuania
Basketball teams established in 1962